Bönningstedt is a municipality in the district of Pinneberg, in Schleswig-Holstein, Germany. It is a "twin town" with Seaford, in East Sussex on the south coast of England.

Bönningstedt was the seat of the Amt ("collective municipality") Bönningstedt. Between January 2007 and January 2013, it was part of the Amt Pinnau.

Bönningstedt used to be a destination for people from Hamburg to enjoy their spare time. This is how this village grew.

Bönningstedt is connected to the public transport system of Hamburg via the AKN railway company.

Telephone numbers in Bönningstedt start 040 (for Hamburg) but the municipality is in Schleswig-Holstein where telephone numbers start 041XX. This is unusual, as telephone numbers indicate location.

References

Pinneberg (district)